Shiryevo is a rural locality (a passing loop) in Nikolskoye Rural Settlement, Kaduysky District, Vologda Oblast, Russia. The population was 8 as of 2002.

Geography 
Shiryevo is located 43 km northwest of Kaduy (the district's administrative centre) by road. Verkhny Dvor is the nearest rural locality.

References 

Rural localities in Kaduysky District